Don't Kiss Ur Friends is the debut EP by Australian singer-songwriter May-a, released on 6 August 2021 by Arcadia and distributed via Sony Music Australia. The record features seven tracks, including the previously-released tracks "Apricots" and "Swing of Things", as well as a remixed version of "Swing of Things" featuring Powfu.

The EP was announced on 1 July 2021 and was written by May-a, Robby De Sa, Gab Strum and others. The record was produced by De Sa and Strum.

At the 2021 ARIA Music Awards, the EP was nominated for Breakthrough Artist - Release.

Track listing

Charts

Release history

References 

2021 debut EPs
EPs by Australian artists